Susy Delgado (born 20 December 1949) is a Paraguayan poet and writer in Spanish and Guarani.

Life
Delgado was born in San Lorenzo in Paraguay in 1949. After obtaining a degree in Sociology in Madrid, Delgado worked as a journalist. She won international recognition in 1985 as a finalist for a Spanish poetry competition in Madrid. In 2017, she won Paraguay's National Prize for Literature, for her poem Ybytu yma.

Her Spanish poetry includes: Some lost tremor (1986), The Court of the Elves. The latter took the Curupayty Radio Award in 1991 and the Municipal Board Award in 1992. In 2001 she had her first prose book published.

She is a member of the Academy of the Guarani Language.

References

1949 births
Living people
People from San Lorenzo, Paraguay
Paraguayan women poets
Paraguayan women journalists
20th-century Paraguayan poets
21st-century Paraguayan poets
Paraguayan journalists
Guarani-language writers
20th-century Paraguayan women writers
21st-century Paraguayan women writers